The Xplore G18 is a Palm OS-powered smartphone created by Group Sense PDA. At some time prior to the 2004 PalmSource developer conference, the code name "Zircon" was changed in favor of the official name "Xplore G18". At the conference, a Group Sense PDA representative 
stated that the G18 is already available to the public in Hong Kong, and that it would be made available in the United States later in 2004.

Some notable features of the G18 are as follows.
 A 320-by-240-pixel camera
 A 160-by-240-pixel screen

Distributors
Italy Xplore Distributor - WiDiNet
Malaysia Xplore Distributor - Alpha-Tech Distribution Sdn. Bhd.
Taiwan Xplore Distributor - Instant-Dict Co., Ltd.

References

External links
Official Website
Iphone 14 Information
Things To Know About iPhone SE
Xplore G18 - Palm Trade Show Offers Glimpses of Newest Gear, Software

Smartphones
Group Sense PDA mobile phones